Linter may refer to:

Places 
 Linter, Belgium, a municipality located in the province of Flemish Brabant
 Linter, a neighborhood of Limburg an der Lahn, Germany

Computing and technology 
 Linter (software), a tool to analyze and find problems in source code.
 Linter SQL RDBMS, database system
 Linter Group, Australian textiles company
 Linter, a machine for removing the short fibers from cotton seeds after ginning.

Surname 
 Dmitri Linter (born 1973), Estonian political activist
 Juliana Emma Linter, British conchologist

See also
 Lint (disambiguation)